André Baeyens (born 29 September 1946) is a former Belgian male archer. He competed at the 1972 Summer Olympics representing Belgium.

References 

1946 births
Living people
Belgian male archers
Olympic archers of Belgium
Archers at the 1972 Summer Olympics
Sportspeople from East Flanders
20th-century Belgian people